Nettru Varai Nee Yaaro is a 2002 Indian Tamil-language romantic action film written and directed by A. Sridhar. It stars Hamsavardhan and Ruchita Prasad. The score and soundtrack for the film was by Deva.

Cast 
Hamsavardhan as Deva
Ruchita Prasad
Sujatha as Meenakshi
Thalaivasal Vijay
Vaiyapuri
Alex

Production
Producer Jayaseelan of Nivedhitha Cine Arts, who had earlier made Maanmanithan (1995), announced that he would cast Hamsavardhan in the lead role, alongside former Miss Bangalore pageant winner Ruchita Prasad. The producer opted for the lead pair despite their relative new presence in the film industry. For his role in the film, actor Alex dressed up like politician Lalu Prasad Yadav.

Release and reception
A reviewer from the entertainment portal ChennaiOnline.com noted, "the opening scenes give promise of this being a film that is meaningful and with social relevance", though added "the rest of the script is slipshod, distracts from the main theme, turning the film into a mediocre entertainer".

References 

2002 films
2000s Tamil-language films
Indian romantic drama films
Indian romantic action films
2000s romantic action films
2002 romantic drama films